The Incredible Journey is a children's book by Scottish author Sheila Burnford.

The Incredible Journey may also refer to:

The Incredible Journey (film), 1963 film based on the book
Homeward Bound: The Incredible Journey, 1993 remake of the 1963 film

See also